Harry Dutfield (December 1879 – 6 June 1918) was an English professional footballer who played as a full back in the Southern Football League for Brentford.

Personal life
Dutfield worked as a leather dresser and married Louisa Brown in 1899. In May 1917, two-and-a-half-years after the outbreak of the First World War, he enlisted in the 4th (Reserve) Battalion of the Leicestershire Regiment (later the Royal Leicestershire Regiment) in Leicester, being posted to France in October. Private Dutfield was killed in action at Poperinge on 6 June 1918 while serving with his regiment's 1st Battalion and was buried in Nine Elms British Cemetery, west of Poperinge. His eldest son, Private George Henry Dutfield of the King's Own Royal Regiment (Lancaster), was killed in April 1918.

Career statistics

References

1879 births
Date of birth missing
1918 deaths
Footballers from Birmingham, West Midlands
Association football fullbacks
English footballers
Southern Football League players
Brentford F.C. players
British Army personnel of World War I
Royal Leicestershire Regiment soldiers
British military personnel killed in World War I
Military personnel from Birmingham, West Midlands